Ilaga is a Christian extremist paramilitary group based in southern Philippines. 

Ilaga may also refer to:

 Ilaga, Indonesia, a small town and a farming valley in Papua, Indonesia

See also
Ilagan, city in the Philippines
Ila, Georgia (Ila, GA), city in U.S.
Llagas Creek